Angoda (also spelled Angonda) is a town in central Ivory Coast. It is a sub-prefecture of Toumodi Department in Bélier Region, Lacs District.

Angoda was a commune until March 2012, when it became one of 1126 communes nationwide that were abolished.

In 2014, the population of the sub-prefecture of Angoda was 14,272.

Villages
The 11 villages of the sub-prefecture of Angoda and their population in 2014 are:

References

Sub-prefectures of Bélier
Former communes of Ivory Coast